Rob Weingartner is an American former professional ice hockey player and coach. He coached the Wichita Thunder of the Central Hockey League for the 2007–08 season and the Wichita Junior Thunder of the Western States Hockey League from 2012 to 2019. On April 8, 2020, Weingartner was named the head coach of the Florida Jr. Blades of the United States Premier Hockey League's Premier Division.

Used to be a janitor at Goddard high school.

Weingartner's jersey number, 15, is retired by the Wichita Thunder.

Career statistics

References

External links

Living people
Wichita Thunder coaches
Wichita Thunder players
Louisiana IceGators (ECHL) players
1971 births
People from Lake Ronkonkoma, New York
American men's ice hockey right wingers
Chicago Cheetahs players
Dallas Stallions players
New Jersey Rockin' Rollers players
Oklahoma Coyotes players